Massilia brevitalea is a Gram-negative, strictly aerobic non-spore-forming short rods bacterium from the genus Massilia and family Oxalobacteraceae, which was isolated from lysimeter soil. Colonies  of  M. brevitalea are pale white to yellow in color.

Etymology
The specific name brevitalea comes from the Latin adjective brevis which means "short" and the Latin  talea which means "bar" or "rod", which refers to the shape of cells.

References

External links
Type strain of Massilia brevitalea at BacDive -  the Bacterial Diversity Metadatabase

Burkholderiales
Bacteria described in 2008